Acontistoptera is a genus of flies in the family Phoridae.

Species
A. brasiliensis Schmitz, 1914
A. hirsuta Borgmeier, 1925
A. melanderi Brues, 1902
A. mexicana Malloch, 1912

References

Phoridae
Platypezoidea genera